PICO-8 is a virtual machine and game engine created by Lexaloffle Games. It is a fantasy video game console that mimics the limited graphical and sound capabilities of 8-bit systems of the 1980s. The goal of this is to encourage creativity and ingenuity in producing games without being overwhelmed with the many possibilities of modern tools and machines. Such a design also allows PICO-8 games to have a familiar look and feel.

Coding on the PICO-8 is accomplished through a Lua-based environment, in which users can create music, sound effects, sprites, maps, and games. 

Users are able to export their games as HTML5 web games or upload their creations to Lexaloffle's official BBS where other users are able to play the games in a web browser, and view the source code. PICO-8 games can also be exported as executable programs, which will run on Windows, macOS, or Linux.

Notable games released for the system include the original version of Celeste, which was created in four days as part of a game jam.

Capabilities 

The PICO-8 program integrates a Lua code editor, sprite and map creation tools, and an audio sound effect and music editor. The program can load games saved locally on a computer, in the form of text or as specially encoded .png images. The interface also supports a splore mode, where games uploaded to the BBS can be previewed and then played in the PICO-8 program. The PocketCHIP miniature computer shipped preloaded with PICO-8.

PICO-8 games, as well as the program's interface itself, are limited to a 128x128 pixel, 16-color display, and a 4-channel audio output. 

The PICO-8 palette contains the following colors:

Colors in the palette can be replaced with a set of different colors by indexing a palette update with a color ID larger than 128. These colors are not officially recognized by the creators; however, they are embraced by the community and given unofficial names.

Development 
PICO-8 began as a BBC BASIC styled BASIC interpreter known as LEX500.

Adoption 

The release of PICO-8 attracted the attention of programmers and video game developers who enjoyed the challenge of developing under these limitations, and spurred the development of similar game engines with intentional retro-style limitations. These engines are now commonly dubbed "fantasy consoles", based on a definition of the term on PICO-8's website, and roughly simulate the strict limitations of old game consoles and computers. Among these are TIC-80, which styles itself as a "fantasy computer," and Pixel Vision 8, which allows the user to specify the simulated hardware limitations they wish to develop under. The development of fantasy consoles, as well as development of games for them, has evolved into its own, almost exclusively hobbyist, sub-community of game development and programming.

PICO-8 has also seen interest among the demoscene, due to its harsh restrictions attracting programmers and musicians who wish to make retro-style demos for the console.

PICO-8 gained additional attention in 2018 with the release of Celeste. Originally created as a PICO-8 game for a game jam, Celeste Classic became one of the most popular games on the PICO-8 BBS, prompting the developers to expand the concept into a more expansive, fully realized game. The original PICO-8 version of Celeste is fully playable as an easter egg in the full version of the game.

References

External links 

 
 PICO-8 and the Search for Cosy Design Spaces: a talk by Joseph White, PICO-8's creator

Video game engines
Fantasy video game consoles
Game engines for Linux
Lua (programming language)-scriptable game engines
Virtual machines